Kyriakos "Koulis" Apostolidis (Greek: Κυριάκος "Κούλης" Αποστολίδης; born 3 March 1946) is a Greek former footballer. He began his career in the North American Soccer League and finished it with PAOK Thessaloniki in Greece. Apostolidis lead the NASL in goals in 1971 and later earned six caps with the Greece national football team. He has also coached in the Greek First Division, most recently with PAOK Thessaloniki FC.

Playing

Youth and college
Apostolidis joined PAOK in 1959 making his debut with the first team in 1963. In 1964, he left for studies in the United States. Apostolidis attended University of San Francisco where he played on men's soccer team under coach Stephen Negoesco from 1964 to 1967 and The Greek Americans A.C. in the San Francisco amateur soccer league His senior year, he was selected as a first team All American.

Professional
In 1968, Apostolidis signed with the Vancouver Royals of the North American Soccer League. The Royals folded at the end of the season and Apostolidis moved to the Dallas Tornado. In 1969, he played as a defender, earning first team All NASL recognition. In 1970, he moved to the front line. The move paid off immediately for the Tornado as Apostolidis led the league in scoring, tying with Carlos Metidieri for the points lead. He was selected as a 1970 second team All NASL. In 1971, he won the title and finished fourth in the league in goals, but left the NASL at the end of the season to return to Greece. Apostolidis signed with PAOK Thessaloniki FC of the Greek First Division. In 1980, he returned to Canada to play in the National Soccer League with Toronto Panhellenic.

National team
Apostolidis earned six caps with the Greece national football team between 1972-76. His first game on 16 February 1972 was a defeat to the Netherlands, 5–0. His last on 6 May 1976 was a win over Poland, 1–0. In the latter, he came on for Maik Galakos in the 63rd minute.

Honours

Club
Dallas Tornado
North American Soccer League: 1971

PAOK
Greek League: 1975–76
Greek Cup: 1971–72, 1973–74

Individual
NASL Top Scorer: 1970
NASL All-Star Second Team selection: 1970

References

External links
NASL stats

Living people
1946 births
Footballers from Thessaloniki
Greek footballers
Greek expatriate footballers
Greece international footballers
Super League Greece players
North American Soccer League (1968–1984) players
PAOK FC players
Dallas Tornado players
San Francisco Dons men's soccer players
University of San Francisco alumni
Vancouver Royals players
Association football forwards
Expatriate soccer players in Canada
Greek expatriate sportspeople in Canada
Expatriate soccer players in the United States
Greek expatriate sportspeople in the United States
Canadian National Soccer League players